Pol-e Mun (also Romanized as Pol-e Mūn; also known as Pol-e Sūn) is a village in Bala Larijan Rural District, Larijan District, Amol County, Mazandaran Province, Iran. At the 2006 census, its population was 141, in 42 families.

References 

Populated places in Amol County